Lauan is an East Fijian language spoken by about 16,000 people on a number of islands of eastern Fiji.

Lauan is spoken in the Lau Province. However, the number of Lauan speakers has been declining due to the presence of other languages, which have become more dominant.

References

External links 

 Kaipuleohone has an archive of Lauan written materials

East Fijian languages
Languages of Fiji